Jaume Morales Moltó (born 21 June 1973 in Altea), sporting nickname Tato, is a Valencian pilota professional player in the ValNet company team. He is a member of the Valencian Pilota Squad.

Trophies 
 Winner of the Circuit Bancaixa 2004, 2005 and 2006
 Runner-up of the Circuit Bancaixa 2000

References

1973 births
Living people
People from Marina Baixa
Sportspeople from the Province of Alicante
Pilotaris from the Valencian Community